The 1973–74 NCAA Division III men's ice hockey season began in November 1973 and concluded on March of the following year. This was the 1st season of Division III college ice hockey.

Regular season

Standings

See also
 1973–74 NCAA Division I men's ice hockey season
 1973–74 NCAA Division II men's ice hockey season

References

External links

 
NCAA